WBXQ (94.3 FM, "Q94") is a radio station broadcasting a classic rock format.  Licensed to the suburb of Patton, Pennsylvania, it serves the Altoona, Pennsylvania metropolitan area.  It first began broadcasting in 1988 under the call sign WKBE.  The station is currently owned by Matt Lightner, through licensee Lightner Communications LLC.  At one time, Q94 at 94.3 was Altoona's top 40 radio outlet.

History

94.3 History
The station was first assigned the call sign "WKBE" on October 31, 1988. On June 16, 1989, the call sign was changed to WHUM-FM and then changed again to WBRX on December 15, 1989. For many years, WBRX simulcasted WBXQ, which was still on 94.7 FM.

WBXQ History
WBXQ first signed on the air in November 1981 as "WRKE" on 94.7 FM, founded by legendary Pittsburgh broadcaster Ed Sherlock and his business partner Neil Hart, who formed Sherlock-Hart Broadcasting the year before.  The station's licensee, however, was listed as Sounds Good, Inc.  In addition to owning WBXQ, both men owned WAMQ (now WWGE) in Loretto, which programmed a format of contemporary country music.

In 1990, Sherlock and Hart dissolved their partnership, with Hart leaving to pursue other interests.  WAMQ, which was falling into some financial difficulty, was sold to WBXQ Operations Manager Tom Stevens in July 1992.  Sherlock retained possession of WBXQ.

According to 100000watts.com, WBRX 94.3 and WBXQ 94.7 swapped calls, retaining their classic rock simulcast, on April 27, 2007.  Fybush.com reports the call swap was apparently filed in error, as it disappeared the next day (the 28th) from the FCC database. On June 28, 2007, the WBRX and WBXQ call signs were officially swapped on 94.3 and 94.7 FM.

On October 22, 2007 WBRX split from the Q94 classic rock simulcast and switched to an adult contemporary format branded as "Mix 94.7".

On April 15, 2009 WBXQ changed their format to country, branded as "True Country 94.3".

On October 28, 2015 WBXQ brought Q94 and classic rock back to the area; the station goes up against WRKY-FM for Altoona rock listeners.

In July 2019, Lightner Communications LLC purchased both WBXQ and WBRX, along with WKMC, WRTA, and two translators, from current owner Rebecca Barger. Matt Lightner is a long time Broadcast Engineer and area business owner. The sale was consummated on October 1, 2019, at a price of $675,000.

References

External links

BXQ